Jatxou or Jatsu is a former railway station in Jatxou, Nouvelle-Aquitaine, France. The station was opened in 1891 and is located on the Bayonne - Saint-Jean-Pied-de-Port railway line. The station is served by TER (local) services operated by the SNCF. It was closed in 2019.

References

Railway stations in France opened in 1891
Defunct railway stations in Pyrénées-Atlantiques